Why the Swallow Has the Tail with Little Horns (tr.:Pochemu u lastochki khvostik rozhkami) is the first animated film made in the Kazakh SSR.  It was directed by Amen Khaydarov and released in 1967.

Plot
The film is based upon the traditional Kazakh fairy tale of the same name.

Creators

Reception
The film was warmly received both by audiences and by professional masters of Soviet animation. It was accepted to a number of domestic and international film festivals, winning a prize at the 1968 All-Union Film Festival and the bronze medal in the children's films category at the 1974 New York Animation Festival. This success was especially noteworthy because the artistic group which worked on the film were not experienced in animation, being recent graduates of the Almaty Art College.

The artistic style of the film also received praise. In the words of Professor Baurzhan Nugerbekov: "The drawings and colours of the film are clear continuations of the smooth, flat designs of the Kazakh ornamental arts; of the clear and colourful compositions on artistic felts".

See also
 History of Russian animation

References

External links

 Why the Swallow Has the Tail with Little Horns at Animator.ru

1967 animated films
1967 films
1967 in the Soviet Union
Films based on fairy tales
Soviet animated films
Russian animated short films
Kazakhstani animated films
Kazakhstani short films
Soviet-era Kazakhstani films